Richard Holmlund (26 October 1963 – 5 October 2011) was a Swedish football manager. He was the manager of Umeå IK in the early 2000s and KIF Örebro in 2010.

He won the UEFA Women's Cup in 2003, the Swedish championship in 2000, 2001 and 2002 and the Swedish Cup in 2001, 2002 and 2010.

He died in a car crash near Örebro in early-October 2011.

References

External links
Richard Holmlund död - "Stor förlust för damfotbollen" - Svenskfotboll.se

1963 births
2011 deaths
Swedish football managers
Seychelles national football team managers
Road incident deaths in Sweden